The Mattress Factory is a contemporary art museum located in Pittsburgh, Pennsylvania. It was a pioneer of site-specific installation art and features permanent installations by artists Yayoi Kusama, James Turrell, and Greer Lankton. The museum's roof itself is a light art installation and part of Pittsburgh's Northside evening skyline.

Barbara Luderowski purchased a derelict Stearns & Foster mattress warehouse in 1975. The museum achieved non-profit status in 1977.  Over the next forty years, Luderowski would attract upcoming installation artists to fill its walls. The Mattress Factory along with its neighbors City of Asylum and Randyland are credited with playing a role in Pittsburgh's revitalization.

History
In 1975, artist and Mattress Factory founder Barbara Luderowski purchased a former Stearns & Foster mattress warehouse at 500 Sampsonia Way in Pittsburgh's Central Northside. Originally, she used the warehouse as a space to live, work and build a community of artists and intellectuals. The community grew and in 1977—after two years of hosting art exhibits and a small food co-op—the Mattress Factory was established as a legal non-profit educational and cultural corporation. Its first exhibition of installation art opened five years later on May 8, 1982, and the museum has since grown to be an integral part of the Pittsburgh arts community, known for its artist residency program, educational programming, and unique exhibitions. In 2008 then-Curator of Exhibitions Michael Olijnyk joined Luderowski in leading the museum as co-director.

Over the years the Mattress Factory has acquired more properties for various purposes, including:
1414 Monterey Street, which became a new gallery space
Two buildings on North Taylor Street that became artist residences
505 Jacksonia Street, which is now used as a parking lot for museum visitors, and the adjacent lot, which now houses Winifred Lutz's Garden Installation, 1993
516 Sampsonia Way, which opened as gallery space in Fall 2013

Sexual Misconduct Allegations 
In September 2018, a report published in Pittsburgh's WESA detailed five employees' allegations of sexual misconduct and the mishandling of the situation by the Mattress Factory and its director, Michael Olijnyk. The complaint was filed with the National Labor Relations Board, and in early January 2019, a settlement was reached and the investigation was closed.

Permanent exhibitions
, the Mattress Factory hosts 17 continuous, permanent installations. The following is a short list of artists who have permanent displays at the Mattress Factory:

Gallery

References

External links
 

1977 establishments in Pennsylvania
Art museums and galleries in Pennsylvania
Art museums established in 1977
Contemporary art galleries in the United States
Modern art museums in the United States
Museums in Pittsburgh
Tourist attractions in Pittsburgh